Alejandro Frangi Caregnato from the University of Sheffield, UK was named Fellow of the Institute of Electrical and Electronics Engineers (IEEE) in 2014 "for contributions to medical image analysis and image-based computational physiology." He holds Ph.D. from Image Sciences Institute, University Medical Center Utrecht and BEng in telecommunications engineering from the Polytechnic University of Catalonia.

References

Year of birth missing (living people)
Living people
Spanish engineers
Polytechnic University of Catalonia alumni
Fellow Members of the IEEE
People associated with the University of Sheffield